Henri Julius Reverony Saint Cyr (15 March 1902 – 27 July 1979) was a Swedish officer and equestrian. Competing in five consecutive Olympics, he won two gold medals in dressage in 1952, and two gold medals in 1956.

Early life
Saint Cyr was born on 15 March 1902 in Stockholm, Sweden, the son of Lieutenant Esaias Saint Cyr and his wife Tyra (née Andersson).

Military career
Saint Cyr was commissioned as an officer in Svea Artillery Regiment (A 1) with the rank of Fänrik in 1924. He attended the Artillery and Engineering College from 1926 to 1928 when he was promoted to Lieutenant. Saint Cyr then attended the Army Riding School from 1928 to 1929, from 1931 to 1932 and from 1934 to 1936. He served as a teacher at the Army Riding School from 1936 to 1940 and he was promoted to Captain in 1938. Saint Cyr became Major in 1944 and attended the Cavalry School in France from 1948 to 1950. He was placed in the reserve in 1957.

Sports career
He competed at five consecutive Olympics from 1936 to 1960 and won two gold medals in 1952 and two in 1956, all in individual and team dressage. At his last Olympics in 1960 he finished fourth in the individual dressage.

Saint Cyr was the national champion in eventing in 1935, 1937, and 1939 and won a world title in the individual dressage in 1953. He took the Olympic Oath at the 1956 Games in Stockholm.

Saint Cyr was a board member of the Swedish Equestrian Federation (Svenska ridsportens centralförbund) from 1932 to 1948 and from 1950 to 1959.

Personal life
In 1921 he married Ruth Constantin-Peterson (1904–1966), the daughter of Bror Constantin-Peterson, a chief physician, and Sophie Psilanderskjöld. He was the father of Madeleine (born 1930) and Guy (born 1934).

Awards and decorations
  Knight of the Order of the Sword (1944)
  H. M. The King's Medal
  Knight of the Legion of Honour

Dates of rank
1924 – Second lieutenant
1928 – Lieutenant
1938 – Captain
1944 – Major

References

External links

1902 births
1979 deaths
Swedish Army officers
Military personnel from Stockholm
Sportspeople from Stockholm
Swedish male equestrians
Swedish dressage riders
Equestrians at the 1936 Summer Olympics
Equestrians at the 1948 Summer Olympics
Equestrians at the 1952 Summer Olympics
Equestrians at the 1956 Summer Olympics
Equestrians at the 1960 Summer Olympics
Olympic gold medalists for Sweden
Olympic medalists in equestrian
Knights of the Order of the Sword
Chevaliers of the Légion d'honneur
Swedish people of French descent
Medalists at the 1956 Summer Olympics
Medalists at the 1952 Summer Olympics
Oath takers at the Olympic Games